Mario Lučić (born 24 April 1981) is a retired Croatian football defender. He was a squad member for the 2004 UEFA European Under-21 Championship.

References

External links
 

1981 births
Living people
Sportspeople from Vinkovci
Association football defenders
Croatian footballers
Croatia under-21 international footballers
HNK Cibalia players
GNK Dinamo Zagreb players
NK Varaždin players
Bnei Yehuda Tel Aviv F.C. players
NK Lučko players
Croatian Football League players
First Football League (Croatia) players
Croatian expatriate footballers
Expatriate footballers in Israel
Croatian expatriate sportspeople in Israel